My Awakening may refer to:

My Awakening: A Path to Racial Understanding 1998 autobiography by David Duke
My Awakening (album), recording by American Jewish rock band Blue Fringe released in 2003

See also
 Awakening (disambiguation)